Country Bucks (stylized as Country Buck$) is an American reality television series. The series premiered on November 19, 2014, on A&E.

Series overview

Episodes

Season 1 (2014)

Season 2 (2015)

References

External links
 

2010s American reality television series
2014 American television series debuts
2015 American television series endings
Television series by Matador Content
A&E (TV network) original programming